Harry Driver (13 May 1931 – 25 November 1973) was a British television scriptwriter and executive producer. He is best remembered for his partnership with Vince Powell on comedy television programmes including Never Mind The Quality Feel The Width, Nearest and Dearest, Bless This House and Love Thy Neighbour.

Biography
Driver formed an amateur comedy act with Vince Powell known as Hammond and Powell, which performed in the Northern club circuit. Driver developed polio in December 1955. According to the BFI Screenonline, he spent "the next 18 months in hospital (12 of them in an iron lung), and, unable to move his arms and legs, the rest of his life in a wheelchair. ... Driver began to write stories and scripts, initially when in the iron lung (via dictation) and then on a typewriter, apparently with a knitting needle clenched between his teeth."

Driver began sending scripts to Granada Television, one of his submissions was eventually accepted. He received his first television credit for an episode of Skyport (1959–60), a drama set in an airport broadcast on 24 March 1960. His former performing partner, Vince Powell, meanwhile, had also turned his hand to writing and had begun to collaborate with Driver. Their first major success was Here's Harry, written with Frank Roscoe.

Personal life
He was the subject of This Is Your Life in 1969 when he was surprised by Eamonn Andrews. He died aged 42 on 25 November 1973.

Writing credits

References

External links

1931 births
1973 deaths
British television writers
Writers from Manchester
20th-century British screenwriters
English people with disabilities